Modesto Valle (15 March 1893 – 7 June 1979) was an Italian footballer who played as a defender. He competed for Italy in the men's football tournament at the 1912 Summer Olympics.

Honours

Club
Pro Vercelli
Italian Football Championship: 1910–11, 1911–12, 1912–13

References

External links
 

1893 births
1979 deaths
Italian footballers
Italy international footballers
Olympic footballers of Italy
Footballers at the 1912 Summer Olympics
People from Biella
Association football defenders
F.C. Pro Vercelli 1892 players
Footballers from Piedmont
Sportspeople from the Province of Biella